Vice-Admiral Sir James Andrew Gardiner Troup, KBE, CB (7 March 1883 – 11 May 1975) was a Royal Navy officer.
Troup was the son of the Rev G. E. Troup of Broughty Ferry and was educated at the High School of Dundee.

Naval career
Troup competed for a cadetship in the Royal Navy in 1897. After serving in the First World War and being promoted to captain on 31 December 1922, he was given command of the cruiser HMS Cairo in November 1926 and of the battleship HMS Revenge in June 1930. He went on to be Captain of the School of Maritime Operations in December 1928 and, having been promoted to rear-admiral on 16 January 1935, he became Director of Naval Intelligence in July 1935.

References

1883 births
1975 deaths
People educated at the High School of Dundee
Royal Navy vice admirals
Directors of Naval Intelligence
Knights Commander of the Order of the British Empire
Companions of the Order of the Bath
Admiralty personnel of World War II